Rômulo José Pacheco da Silva (born 27 October 1995), simply known as Rômulo, is a Brazilian footballer who plays for Chengdu Rongcheng as a midfielder.

Club career
Rômulo was born in Recife, Pernambuco, and graduated with Bahia's youth setup. On 16 November 2014 he made his first team – and Série A – debut, coming on as a second-half substitute in a 1–2 home loss against Corinthians.

On 10 February 2015 Rômulo renewed his contract until 2018.

On 6 February 2017, Rômulo signed with Korean second division side Busan IPark on a one year loan deal. After a successful debut season in Korea, Rômulo signed a three year contract with the club. In both 2018 and 2019, Rômulo was named in the official K League 2 team of the season. In the final game of the 2019 season, Rômulo scored a 77th minute penalty to give Busan the lead in the promotion-relegation playoff final against local rivals Gyeongnam FC. Busan went on to win the game 2-0 and achieve promotion to the K League 1.

On 15 April 2021 Rômulo would join Chinese second tier football club Chengdu Rongcheng. In his debut seasons with the club he would establish himself as a regular within the team and aid them to promotion at the end of the 2021 league campaign.

Career statistics
As of 8 January 2023

References

External links
Bahia official profile 

1995 births
Living people
Sportspeople from Recife
Brazilian footballers
Brazilian expatriate footballers
Association football midfielders
Campeonato Brasileiro Série A players
Campeonato Brasileiro Série B players
Esporte Clube Bahia players
Footballers at the 2015 Pan American Games
Pan American Games bronze medalists for Brazil
Pan American Games medalists in football
Busan IPark players
K League 2 players
Expatriate footballers in South Korea
Brazilian expatriate sportspeople in South Korea
Brazil youth international footballers
Medalists at the 2015 Pan American Games